Zhang Jianya (born 1951) is a Chinese film director. As a graduate of the 1982 class of the Beijing Film Academy, Zhang is a founding member of the so-called Fifth Generation, a group that also includes in its numbers directors such as Zhang Yimou, Chen Kaige, and Tian Zhuangzhuang.

Directorial career
Trained as a carpenter, Zhang's cinematic career began when he joined the Shanghai Film Studio in the mid-1970s as an actor.  Upon his graduation in 1982, Zhang directed the children's film, Red Elephant, with his classmates, Tian, and Xie Xiaojing, and helped the studio head Wu Yigong direct the 1987 West German co-production, The Tribulations of Young Master. Beginning with 1988's Kidnapping Karajan, Zhang has carved himself a niche with urban comedies, often based in the city of Shanghai.

Zhang Jianya has also expanded his interests into producing in his role as the head of the 3rd Creative Group at the Shanghai Film Studio, as well as into other genres, including action-thrillers such as 1999's Crash Landing and 2002's Red Snow.

Selected filmography

As director

References

External links

Zhang Jianya at the Chinese Film Database

Chinese film producers
Film directors from Shanghai
Beijing Film Academy alumni
1951 births
Living people